Bimota is an Italian manufacturer of custom and production motorcycles. It was founded in 1973 in Rimini by Valerio Bianchi, Giuseppe Morri, and Massimo Tamburini. The company name is a portmanteau derived from the first two letters of each of the three founders' surnames: Bianchi, Morri, and Tamburini.

Products 

Because the state of frame design was stagnant in the 1970s, Bimota concentrated initially on building high-quality motorcycle chassis around existing engines. From the beginning they customised the top models of Suzuki, Honda and Kawasaki. During the late 1970s, Bimota also helped develop and build motorcycles branded as Lamborghinis. In the 1980s they also customised Yamaha and Ducati motorcycles.

Bimota's co-founder and long-time chief designer Tamburini has been an influential player in the development of other Italian brands, most significantly his work on the popular Ducati 916, the Ducati Paso, and the MV Agusta F4; other designers such as Bimota chief Sergio Robbiano have also been involved with larger-volume manufacturers.

More recent Bimota models included the DB5, DB6, DB7, DB9 and the Tesi, with a DB8 featuring the Ducati 1198 engine. The  Tesi 3D was especially unusual, which, along with the co-designed Vyrus, was the only motorcycle then in production to use hub-center steering.

Racing 
Bimota first experienced international racing success in 1980 when Jon Ekerold, a true privateer, won the 350cc world championship on a Yamaha-powered Bimota. They also experienced success in the early years of the Superbike World Championship. Virginio Ferrari won the 1987 Formula TT title aboard a YB4 EI, partnering with Davide Tardozzi. Tardozzi won five races in the inaugural  world superbike championship, more than any other competitor, but inconsistent results relegated him to third place in the final standings.

The Alstare team entered a Bimota BB3 package into World Superbikes in 2014 for riders Ayrton Badovini and Christian Iddon, however the bike initially did not have enough units in production to pass the championship's homologation rules. As a compromise, the bikes were allowed to enter from round 2, but ineligible for points until homologation was achieved. At the end of the year the team finished unclassified and disqualified.

Bankruptcy and rebirth 

The V Due, introduced in 1997, had a design flaw with its engine.  Bimota was forced to abandon the novel fuel injection system and re-engineer the entire engine. Bimota ultimately recalled the entire run of the V Due, and made an improved version, the 'Evoluzione'. Only 340 original V Dues and 21 Evoluziones were built.  While this was occurring, during the 2000 World Superbike season, one of Bimota's main sponsors disappeared, owing the company a great deal of money.  The combination of events forced Bimota to file for bankruptcy and close their doors.

In 2003, new owners of the marque assets, Lorenzo Ducati and Giuseppi Della Pietra, formed Alternativa Moto, with the intention to manufacture all-Italian machines using Ducati engines, and sold the V-Due rights to Win-Win.

A new group of investors purchased the rights to the Bimota name and designs and restarted the company. The investors that bought Bimota, Marco Chiancianesi who is the president and his business partner Daniele Longoni are both active Scientologists.

Recent reports paint a less optimistic picture for the future of Bimota. In 2017, the factory at Rimini had reportedly closed, with spares and incomplete bikes mothballed elsewhere, possibly Switzerland.

In October 2019, Kawasaki Heavy Industries purchased a 49% stake in the company, and soon after announced an intention to manufacture Bimota bikes using parts from the Kawasaki supply chain.

Models 

Racing motorcycles 
 Bimota GB1
 Bimota HB4
 HDB1
 HDB2
 HDB3
 Bimota SB1
 Bimota SB8K
 Bimota YB3
 BIC 500 8v BM 3
 V 90 BM 4

2021 motorcycles 
 Bimota Tesi H2
 Bimota Tesi H2 Carbon
 Bimota KB4
 Bimota KB4 RC

See also 

Bimota V Due
Bimota BB3
Bimota DB1
List of Italian companies
List of motorcycle manufacturers

Notes

References 

 "The Ultimate History of Fast Motorcycles", By: Brown, Ronald. Pages 148-149, 174-175, 210-211, 230, 248-249, 286-287 Published by Parragon Publishing 2002.  .
 Bimota.it Historical Models.  Accessed October 5, 2012.  http://www.bimota.it/en/storia_modelli.asp
 Bimota.it Company History.  Accessed October 5, 2012. https://web.archive.org/web/20121027002943/http://www.bimota.it/en/storia.asp

External links 

 

 
Motorcycle manufacturers of Italy
Italian brands
Vehicle manufacturing companies established in 1973
Italian companies established in 1973
Massimo Tamburini